The Source is a live album by American saxophonist Jackie McLean featuring Dexter Gordon recorded at the Jazzhus Montmartre in 1973 and released on the SteepleChase label.

Critical reception

Robert Christgau wrote in his 1977 column in The Village Voice that he preferred The Source to both McLean's The Meeting and Gordon's 1976 Homecoming if he wanted to "hear recent live Dexter". AllMusic critic Scott Yanow was less enthusiastic, writing that "the music is a bit loose and long-winded ('Half Nelson' is over 18 minutes long) but recommended to straightahead jazz fans".

Track listing
 " Half Nelson" (Miles Davis) - 18:36
 "I Can't Get Started" (Vernon Duke, Ira Gershwin) - 7:18
 "Another Hair-Do" (Charlie Parker) - 13:31 		
 "Dexter Digs In" (Dexter Gordon) - 11:04

Personnel
Jackie McLean – alto saxophone
Dexter Gordon – tenor saxophone
Kenny Drew – piano
Niels-Henning Ørsted Pedersen – bass
Alex Riel – drums

References

External links 
 

SteepleChase Records live albums
Jackie McLean live albums
Dexter Gordon live albums
1974 live albums